Edward William Welch (born 22 October 1947) is an English songwriter, composer, conductor and arranger.

Early life and education 
Ed Welch had a classical music upbringing. He attended Christ Church Cathedral School from 1957-1961, where he was Head Chorister at Christ Church Cathedral, Oxford then a first music scholar at Ardingly College in Sussex. He gained a scholarship to Trinity College of Music London, studying composition with Arnold Cooke. Upon graduating in 1965, he joined United Artists Music where he learned the various branches of the music business. He wrote arrangements, composed 'B' sides and plugged the UA catalogue at the BBC.

Songwriting 
In 1971, Welch recorded an album, Clowns, including songs he had co-written with Tom Paxton, and session musicians including Mike de Albuquerque and Cozy Powell. In 1972, he acted as producer on a version of "I Don't Know How to Love Him" by Sylvie McNeill  on a UK 45 on United Artists UA UP35415 released in time for the first UK Stage Musical of Jesus Christ Superstar. In 1973 he wrote the title song to Spike Milligan's film Adolf Hitler: My Part in his Downfall, which marked the start of a 25-year collaboration with Milligan.

Welch made his television debut in 1972, on The Old Grey Whistle Test. In 1978 and 1979, he appeared in the Spike Milligan BBC series Q8 and Q9, performing his own songs (including "The Carpet is Always Greener Under Someone Else's Bed" and "Love to Make Music by") and songs co-written with Milligan, including "I've Got This Photograph of You!" and "Silly Old Baboon". This unlikely duo released an album in 1979 on the United Artists label, Spike Milligan and Ed Welch Sing Songs from Q8. In 1976, he composed the score for Milligan's adaptation of Paul Gallico's The Snow Goose. Narrated by Milligan and performed by the London Symphony Orchestra with Welch conducting, the RCA recording was such a success that it entered the pop LP charts and has been performed at many concerts since.

Welch's songs have been recorded by artists including Cilla Black, Davy Jones, Shirley Bassey, Matt Monro, Design, and Tina Reynolds, whose recording of 'When Morning Has Come' reached number 20 on the Irish charts in 1973. 

Welch co-wrote the 1995 Icelandic entry to the Eurovision Song Contest, Núna, (with Björgvin Halldórsson).

Compositions for stage, screen and recorded narrations 
His film work included the scores to British sex comedies such as the Confessions series (Confessions of a Pop Performer (1975), Confessions of a Driving Instructor (1976), Confessions from a Holiday Camp (1977)), Stand Up, Virgin Soldiers (1977), and Rosie Dixon - Night Nurse (1978). Also in 1978, he composed the score for the remake of The Thirty Nine Steps, including an extended piano piece entitled The Thirty Nine Steps Concerto (a nod to Richard Addinsell's Warsaw Concerto), later recording it with Christopher Headington as soloist. In the same year, he moved to the West Country where he was appointed Musical Director for Television South West (TSW). He composed the station identification music for TSW, as well as scores for TSW films such as the musical Doubting Thomas (1983; written by John Bartlett, starring Paul Nicholas and Stephanie Lawrence), and numerous local programmes, including Gus Honeybun in 1987.  Welch also composed and conducted music for Television South (TVS), from 1987 until the channel disappeared on 31 December 1992. His credits at TVS included conducting a live two and a half hour New Year's Eve show, with 56 musical items, some of which he had also arranged.

In 1982 Welch composed the score for the play Private Dick, by Richard Maher and Roger Michell. He also composed the score to the Cannon and Ball comedy film The Boys in Blue. The following year he wrote the theme to the popular ITV, BBC Two and Sky1 quiz show Blockbusters, which ran from 1983 to 2001; the tune soon became one of the most recognisable television themes of all time.

Among his work for children, Welch composed the score for Andrew Bailey's Aesop in Fableland (Arista Records, 1979), which was narrated by Arthur Lowe and performed by the London Symphony Orchestra. He adapted fairy tales and wrote the scripts for a 1982 LP with Spike Milligan, later developed into a children's cartoon series of the same name, Wolves, Witches and Giants, which ran from 1995 to 1999. He is credited for the music in the 2001 cartoon series, Binka. He wrote songs for the new format of Thomas & Friends from 2004 to 2008.

Other work 
With Roger Messer, Welch ran South Western Studios in Torquay, a company which produced professional demonstration tapes for aspiring songwriters. In 2004, he composed a piece of music for Liberal Democrat candidate, Mike Treleaven.

Composed
 The $64,000 Question 
 All Clued Up 
 Blockbusters (1983-1994, 2000-2001) 
 Catchphrase (1986-1994) 
 Connections (1988-1989)
 Construction Site (1999-2003)
 Crosswits 
 Doctor at the Top (1991)
 Family Catchphrase (1994)
 Frootie Tooties (1992)
 Grizzly Tales for Gruesome Kids (2000-2006; 2011-2012)
 Funky Valley
 The Hoobs (2001)
 Knightmare (1987)
 Mopatop's Shop (1999-2005)
 The National Lottery (1998)
 New Faces  (1986-1998)
 North Tonight (1988-1990)
 One Foot in the Grave (incidental music) 
 Parallel 9 (1992)
 The Dodo Club (1987-1989)
 That's Showbusiness (1989-1991)
 The Ratties (1987)
 Thomas and Friends (2004–2008)
 Shillingbury Tales (1981) 
 Sweethearts (1987)
 That's My Dog!
Ed Welch also composed over 300 pieces, including pieces for a music library and a number of local programmes for a number of ITV contractors, mainly TVS and TSW

References

External links
.
"Famous composer sends Mike Treleaven on the march to victory!"

1947 births
Living people
People educated at Ardingly College
English composers
English male composers
English television composers
People from Oxfordshire
Alumni of Trinity College of Music
Castlebar Song Contest winners
Jingle composers